American Idol Live! 2018 was a summer concert tour in the United States that features the Top 7 finalists of the sixteenth season of American Idol.

Performers
 Maddie Poppe (winner)
 Caleb Lee Hutchinson (runner-up)
 Gabby Barrett (3rd place)
 Cade Foehner (4th/5th place)
 Michael J. Woodard (4th/5th place)
 Catie Turner (6/7th place)
 Jurnee (6/7th place)
 Kris Allen (season 8 winner)
 In Real Life (July 11–August 12)
 Forever in Your Mind (August 13–September 16)

Setlist
Top 7 – "Meant to Be" (Bebe Rexha feat. Florida Georgia Line)
Jurnee – "Never Enough" (Loren Allred)
Catie Turner – "Part of Me" (Katy Perry), "Havana" (with Gabby Barrett and Jurnee on backing vocals) (Camila Cabello feat. Young Thug)
Barrett, Turner and Michael J. Woodard – "Titanium" (David Guetta feat. Sia)
Barrett, Jurnee and Woodard – "Bang Bang" (Jessie J, Ariana Grande and Nicki Minaj)
Barrett – "Little Red Wagon" (Audra Mae), "Church Bells" (Carrie Underwood), "Don't Stop Believin'" (Journey) 
Top 7 – "My Church" (Maren Morris)
Barrett, Cade Foehner, Jurnee and Turner – "How Come U Don't Call Me Anymore?" (Prince)
Maddie Poppe – "Brand New Key" (with Turner on tambourine and with Caleb Lee Hutchinson and Woodard on backing vocals) (Melanie)
Hutchinson – "Like a Wrecking Ball" (with Kris Allen and Foehner on guitars) (Eric Church), "Don't Close Your Eyes" (with Foehner on guitar) (Keith Whitley), "Folsom Prison Blues" (with Allen and Foehner on guitars) (Johnny Cash)
Foehner – "No Good" (Kaleo), "The Thrill Is Gone" (B.B. King) 
Barrett and Foehner – "Never Tear Us Apart" (INXS) 
Allen – "Falling Slowly" (Glen Hansard and Markéta Irglová), "Ain't No Sunshine" (Bill Withers), "Heartless" (Kanye West), "When All the Stars Have Died" (Kris Allen), "Live Like We're Dying" (The Script)
Woodard – "My Heart Will Go On" (Celine Dion), "Maybe This Time" (Kander and Ebb), "Beauty and the Beast" (with Barrett and Turner on backing vocals) (Angela Lansbury)
Hutchinson and Poppe – "You've Got a Friend" (Carole King)
Poppe – "God Only Knows" (The Beach Boys), "Going, Going, Gone" (Maddie Poppe), "Rainbow Connection" (with Allen and Hutchinson on backing vocals) (Jim Henson)
All – "There's Nothing Holdin' Me Back" (Shawn Mendes)

Tour dates

References

American Idol concert tours
2018 concert tours